Mai (English: Mother) is Bhojpuri film of drama genre, released in 1989 and directed by Rajkumar Sharma.

Cast
 Narayan Bhandari
 Sheela David
 Padma Khanna
 Vijay Khare
 Pankaj Sarma
 Hari Shukla
 Sharda Sinha

Crew
 Film director : Raj Kumar Sharma

See also
 Bhojpuri Film Industry
 List of Bhojpuri films

References

1989 films
1980s Bhojpuri-language films